D is the fourth letter of the Latin alphabet.

D or d may also refer to:

Places
 D River, in Oregon, US
 Detroit, US (nickname "D")

People with the name
 D, the bass player for Australian band Testeagles
 "D!" or "Dee!", names of Detlef Soost, a German dancer and choreographer

Arts, entertainment, and media

Fictional entities
 D, a character in a series of novels titled Vampire Hunter D by Hideyuki Kikuchi
 D, a nickname given to Count Dracula in the novel Dracula written by Bram Stoker
 D, one of the characters in Another Code: Two Memories (Trace Memory)
 Count D, a character in the anime/manga series Pet Shop of Horrors
 Substance D, a fictional recreational drug in the novel and film A Scanner Darkly

Games
 D (video game), a game released in 1995 for the PC, 3DO, PlayStation and Sega Saturn

Music

Groups and labels
D (band), a Japanese rock/metal band
D Records, a former record label in Houston, Texas, US
"d:" or "d:?", often used to refer to the Christian rock band Delirious?
"The D", one of the names of comedy rock band Tenacious D

Albums
 D (Deuter album), 1971
 D (Os Paralamas do Sucesso album), 1987
 D (White Denim album), 2011
 D (single album), by Big Bang, 2015
 D, followed by a number, a composition by Franz Schubert according to the Schubert Thematic Catalogue
 Substance D, a drum and bass compilation album by Dieselboy

Other uses in music
 D (musical note)
 D major, a scale
 D major chord; See Chord names and symbols
 D minor, a scale
 Steinway D-274 or D, a concert grand piano model manufactured by Steinway & Sons
 "D", a song by Little River Band from their album Playing to Win

Periodicals
 D, a weekly supplement to the Italian newspaper la Repubblica
 D Magazine, a magazine for the city of Dallas, Texas, US

Other uses in arts, entertainment, and media
 D (film), a 2005 Bollywood film
 Initial D, a 1995 Japanese manga and anime about mountain drifting that has spawned several arcade and console games
D, the production code for the 1964 Doctor Who serial Marco Polo
 "D" Is for Deadbeat, the fourth novel in Sue Grafton's "Alphabet mystery" series, published in 1987

Business and economics
 Demand (D), in economics
 Dominion Resources (New York Stock Exchange ticker symbol D)
 Federal Reserve Bank of Cleveland (serial numbers of United States dollars, beginning with D)
 Penny (British pre-decimal coin) (d)

Computing, technology, and engineering

Computing
 .d, a file format used for Agilent MassHunter mass spectrometry software
 , a pathname component suffix for a directory; for example with the init program
 -d, a suffix of a daemon, a computer program that runs as a background process
 D - Minimal Protection, a security division in the Trusted Computer System Evaluation Criteria

Programming languages
 D (programming language), a C++-like programming language developed by Walter Bright
 D, a programming language designed to be used with the DTrace dynamic tracing framework

Other uses in technology
 D, Mitsubishi Electric's mobile phones in Japan
 D battery, a standard size dry cell battery in electronics
 d, sensitivity index, a statistic used in signal detection theory

Linguistics
 ’d, a contraction of the English words had and would
 Dingir (D), the Sumerian sign for deity
 [d] or /d/, Voiced alveolar stop consonant in the International Phonetic Alphabet

Mathematics and science

Measurements
 d, deci-, SI prefix factor 0.1

Astronomy and Earth science
 D, a February 16 through 29 discovery in the provisional designation of a comet or asteroid
 D, for "Degenerate", a white dwarf in stellar classification
 D/, for "destroyed/disappeared" in comet nomenclature
 D region, part of the ionosphere

Mathematics
 D, 500 in Roman numerals
 D, Thirteen, or D in hexadecimal and other positional numeral systems with a radix of 14 or greater
 D and d, the derivative operators
 d, the symbol for the total differential operator; in a related but more general meaning, it is the exterior derivative operator in differential geometry
 d, often a variable for the diameter of a circle in geometry
 d(n), Divisor function, the number of positive divisors of an integer n
  in blackboard bold, the unit disk in the complex plane, or the decimal fractions; see Number
 Cohen's d, a statistical measure of effect size.

Biology, chemistry, and medicine
 D, Aspartic acid, in biochemistry
 D (or Asp), an abbreviation for the amino acid aspartate
 D, Diarrhea 
 D, deuterium, an isotope of hydrogen
 d, Deuteron, the nucleus of deuterium
 D- prefix, a dextrorotatory compound
 ATC code D Dermatologicals, a section of the Anatomical Therapeutic Chemical Classification System
 Haplogroup D (mtDNA), a human mitochondrial DNA (mtDNA) haplogroup
 Haplogroup D-M174, a Y-chromosomal DNA (Y-DNA) haplogroup
 Vitamin D

Physics
 D, Debye (D), a unit of electrical dipole moment
 D, Dioptre (D), a unit of measurement of the optical power of a lens or curved mirror (also in Medicine)
 D, Diffusion coefficient (D), in molecular physics
 D, Electric displacement field (D) 
 D meson, mesons containing charm quarks in particle physics
 d, thickness, diameter, relative density, lattice plane spacing, and degeneracy of vibrational mode, in molecular spectroscopy
 D band (disambiguation)

Solid state physics
 D(E), a function of energy
 Debye–Waller factor (D)
 Diode (D), an electronic component
 Wavenumber [D(k)], a symbol for the density of states

Time
 Day (d), in metrology
 December (D), in calendars
 Dominical letter D, for a common year starting on Thursday

Transportation
 D (Los Angeles Railway), a line operated by the Los Angeles Railway, US
 D (New York City Subway service), US
 D Line (Los Angeles Metro), US
 Drive, or D, the forward cruising gears in an automatic transmission
 Tesla Model D, a concept all-wheel drive electric sedan
 Line D of the Buenos Aires Subte

Other uses
 D (grade), a below average grade in education
 D, a brassiere cup size
 d, the number of sides of dice in role-playing games
 d, the common US measurement of the penny size (an approximation of length), of a nail
 500 (number), D in Roman numerals
 D-Company, a criminal group
 Daughter (d)
 Defense (sports) (D)
 Democrat (D), a member of the US Democratic Party
 Denarius, a Roman coin
 Died (d.)
 Dominant person (D/), in dominance and submission
 Delta, the military time zone code for UTC+04:00
 D, the international license plate code for Germany (Deutschland)

See also
 D♯ (disambiguation)
 D- All Things Digital, an annual technology conference
 Dee (disambiguation)
 Filetab-D, a port of the Filetab language based on decision tables